John S. Herron (November 7, 1872 – September 13, 1947), served as the 48th Mayor of Pittsburgh from 1933 to 1934. As of 2023, he is the last Republican to be mayor.

Early life
Born in Oswego, New York, Herron came to Pittsburgh as a blue-collar worker and quickly entered leadership as President of the Bricklayers Union.  Using his labor connections Herron ran for City Council successfully in 1913 and served on council until he ascended to mayorship as city council president in  1933 due to Charles Kline's resignation. He was defeated in his bid for a full term later in the year.

Pittsburgh politics
Herron served only one term as Pittsburgh Mayor and had an uneventful administration.  During his term, the city adopted the repeal of the commonwealth's "Sunday Blue Laws" prohibiting business and sports for 24 hours.  The repeal of the Blue Laws made it possible for the future Pittsburgh Steelers to join the National Football League.  Upon leaving the mayor's office he served as County Commissioner until his death in 1947.

To date, Herron holds the distinction of having been the last Republican mayor of the City of Pittsburgh.

1872 births
1947 deaths
Mayors of Pittsburgh
Politicians from Oswego, New York
Burials at Homewood Cemetery